The 1898 Iowa Hawkeyes football team represented the University of Iowa in the 1898 college football season. This was Alden Knipe's first as head coach of the Hawkeyes and Iowa's first year as an independent after the dissolution of the Western Interstate University Football Association (WIUFA).  Iowa joined the Western Conference in 1900.

Schedule

References

Iowa
Iowa Hawkeyes football seasons
Iowa Hawkeyes football